Salvat Etchart (1924 - 1985 Bordeaux) was a French writer, winner of the 1967 Prix Renaudot.

Biography 
He moved to Martinique in 1955. He was critical of neo-colonial society.
He taught French literature in Quebec, beginning in 1970.

Works
 Une bonne à six, éditions Julliard, 1962; Un couple, éditions de la Mauvaise graine, 2003
 Les nègres servent d'exemple, éditions Julliard, 1964
 Le Monde tel qu'il est, Mercure de France 1967; la collection Babel, 2004, Prix Renaudot
 L'Homme empêché, Mercure de France, 1977
 L'Amour d'un fou, éditions des Presses de la Renaissance, 1984, 
 Le Temps des autres, Presse de la Renaissance, 1987

References

External links
"Salvat", French wikipedia
"Salvat Etchart", French wikiquote
http://www.ajol.info/index.php/lwati/article/view/36782

1924 births
1985 deaths
Prix Renaudot winners
Martiniquais writers
20th-century French novelists
French male novelists
20th-century French male writers
1985 suicides
Suicides by firearm in France